The Blind Side is a 2009 American biographical sports drama film written and directed by John Lee Hancock. Based on the 2006 book of the same name by Michael Lewis, the film tells the story of Michael Oher, an American football offensive lineman who overcame an impoverished upbringing to play in the National Football League (NFL) with the help of his adoptive parents Sean and Leigh Anne Tuohy. It stars Sandra Bullock as Leigh Anne Tuohy, Tim McGraw as Sean Tuohy, and Quinton Aaron as Oher.

The film was a commercial success, grossing $309 million on a $29 million budget. Despite mixed reviews from critics, Bullock's performance was universally praised, leading to her winning the Academy Award for Best Actress. Bullock also won the Golden Globe Award for Best Actress in a Motion Picture – Drama and the Screen Actors Guild Award for Outstanding Performance by a Female Actor in a Leading Role. The film also received a nomination for the Academy Award for Best Picture.

Plot

Seventeen-year-old Michael "Big Mike" Oher has been in foster care with different families in Tennessee, due to his mother's drug addiction, but every time he is placed in a new home, he runs back to her. His friend's father, on whose couch Mike has been sleeping, asks Burt Cotton, the football coach of Wingate Christian School, to help enroll his son and Mike. Impressed by Mike's size and athleticism, Cotton gets him admitted despite his poor academic record. Later, Michael is befriended by a younger student named Sean Tuohy Jr. ("SJ"). SJ's mother, Leigh Anne, is a strong-minded interior designer and the wife of wealthy businessman Sean Sr.

The school staff tells Michael that his father has died, apparently due to an accident. Later, Leigh Anne and Sean watch their daughter Collins playing volleyball. After the game, Sean notices Michael picking up food discarded on the bleachers. One night, Leigh Anne notices Michael walking alone on the road, shivering in the cold without adequate clothing. When she learns that he plans to spend the night huddled outside the closed school gym, Leigh Anne offers to let him sleep on the couch in the Tuohy home.
 
The next morning, Leigh Anne notices that Michael has left. Seeing him walking away, she asks him to spend the Thanksgiving holiday with her family. Later, Leigh Anne drives Michael to his mother's house. He sees an eviction notice posted on the door, indicating that his mother is gone. Slowly, Michael becomes a member of the Tuohy family; Leigh Anne's friends question this and suggest that Collins might not be safe around him, but Leigh Anne criticizes them. She later asks Collins how she feels about it. Collins replies that they cannot just throw Michael out. When Leigh Anne seeks to become Michael's legal guardian, she learns he was taken from his drug-addict mother when he was seven and that no one knows her whereabouts. She is also told that, although he scored poorly in a career aptitude test, he ranked in the 98th percentile in "protective instincts". Michael eventually improves his grades enough that he can play football at school. However, Michael appears to be hesitant to use his strength and size while practicing, Leigh Anne tells him, as an offensive lineman, he must protect his quarterback. From that moment, Michael improves dramatically, well enough to play at the college level. However, to do that, he must meet the minimum grade point average to get in so the Tuohys hire a private tutor for him, the outspoken and kind Miss Sue.

Leigh Anne has a face-to-face conversation with Michael's mother about adopting him. Although she seems unresponsive in the beginning, the mother finally wishes Michael the best. Michael is heavily recruited by many prestigious schools. SJ talks to coaches and negotiates on Michael's behalf—and his own. When Michael gets his grades high enough, he decides to attend the University of Mississippi (known colloquially as "Ole Miss"). But as Ole Miss was where Sean Sr. had played basketball, Leigh Anne had been a cheerleader, and Miss Sue had been as well, NCAA investigator Granger is tasked to look into the matter to determine if the Tuohys took him in and unduly influenced him just so he would play for their alma mater.

Michael runs away before the interview is over and confronts Leigh Anne about her motives for taking him in. He then proceeds to find his biological mother in Hurt Village. A gang leader welcomes him back, offers him a beer, and makes sexually offensive insinuations about Leigh Anne and Collins. When Michael gets angry, the gang leader threatens to go after them, and as a result, Michael battles with him and others. After thinking things over and questioning Leigh Anne, Michael tells Granger he chose Ole Miss because "it's where my family goes to school." Michael is accepted into college and says his farewells to the Tuohy family.

The film ends with information about and photos of the real Tuohy family and Michael Oher. He was drafted by the Baltimore Ravens in the first round of the 2009 NFL Draft and played in the National Football League.

Cast

 Sandra Bullock as Leigh Anne Tuohy, Michael's adoptive mother
 Tim McGraw as Sean Tuohy, Michael's adoptive father
 Quinton Aaron as Michael "Big Mike" Oher
 Brandon Rivers as Young Mike
 Kathy Bates as Miss Sue
 Jae Head as Sean "S.J." Tuohy Jr., Michael's adoptive younger brother
 Lily Collins as Collins Tuohy, Michael's adoptive younger sister
 Ray McKinnon as Coach Cotton
 Kim Dickens as Mrs. Boswell
 Adriane Lenox as Denise Oher, Michael's biological mother
 IronE Singleton as Alton, a gang leader/drug dealer

A number of NCAA Division I Football Bowl Subdivision coaches and recruiters make brief appearances as themselves: Phillip Fulmer, Lou Holtz, Tom Lemming, Houston Nutt, Ed Orgeron, Franklin "Pepper" Rodgers, Nick Saban, and Tommy Tuberville.

While Oher's coach from high school, Hugh Freeze, has an uncredited cameo as a coach watching some game film, the role of the high school coach is named Coach Cotton in the film. NFL commissioner Roger Goodell had an uncredited voice cameo announcing Michael's drafting into the Baltimore Ravens during the 2009 NFL Draft.

Production
The Blind Side was produced by Alcon Entertainment and released by Warner Bros. The film's production budget was $29 million. Filming for the school scenes took place at Atlanta International School and The Westminster Schools in Atlanta, Georgia, and it features many of their students as extras. The film premiered on November 17 in New York City and New Orleans, and opened in theaters in the rest of the United States and in Canada on November 20.

Academy Award winner Julia Roberts was originally offered Bullock's role, but turned it down. Bullock initially turned down the starring role three times due to discomfort with portraying a devout Christian. By her own account, Bullock felt she could not objectively represent such a person's beliefs on screen. But after a visit with the real Leigh Anne Tuohy, Bullock not only won the role, but also took a pay cut and agreed to receive a percentage of the profits instead.

Reception

Box office
The Blind Side opened in 3,110 theaters on its opening weekend, the weekend of November 20, 2009. It grossed a strong $34.5 million in its opening weekend, the second highest gross of that weekend, behind The Twilight Saga: New Moon. It was the highest-grossing opening weekend of Sandra Bullock's career. The per-theater average for The Blind Sides opening weekend was $11,096. In its opening weekend, the movie already earned more than its $29 million production budget. It proved to have remarkable staying power, taking in an additional $9.5 million, bringing its gross to $60.1 million by the weekend of November 27, 2009. The movie enjoyed a rare greater success for the second weekend than it did in its opening weekend, taking in an estimated $40 million, an increase of 18 percent, from November 27 to November 29, 2009, coming in second to New Moon once again, bringing its gross to $100.3 million.

In its third weekend, the movie continued its trend of rare feats by moving up to the number one position with $20.4 million in sales after spending the previous two weekends in second place for a total gross of $128.8 million, due to strong word-of-mouth. In its fourth weekend, it moved down to second place, dropping a slim 23% with an estimated $15.5 million for a total of $150.2 million in the United States and Canada as of December 13, 2009. The film hit $200 million domestically on January 1, 2010, marking the first time a movie marketed with a sole actress' name above the title (Bullock's) has crossed the $200 million mark. The Blind Side has also become the highest grossing football movie and sports drama of all time domestically unadjusted for ticket inflation. The Blind Side ended its domestic theatrical run on June 4, 2010 (nearly 7 months after it opened), earning a total of nearly $256 million. In the United Kingdom and Ireland, The Blind Side was released on March 26, 2010. It was the third biggest release of that weekend behind Nanny McPhee and the Big Bang and Tim Burton's Alice in Wonderland.

Critical response

Sandra Bullock's performance on The Blind Side received wide praise. The site's critical consensus reads, "It might strike some viewers as a little too pat, but The Blind Side has the benefit of strong source material and a strong performance from Sandra Bullock." Metacritic, which assigned a score of 53 out of 100, based on reviews from 29 critics, indicating "mixed or average reviews". Audiences polled by CinemaScore gave the film a rare "A+" grade.

A. O. Scott of The New York Times commented on the performances: "Ms. Bullock is convincing enough as an energetic, multitasking woman of the New South, who knows her own mind and usually gets her own way. And Tim McGraw, as Leigh Anne's affable husband, Sean, inhabits his character comfortably and knows how to get out of Ms. Bullock's way when necessary." He found the movie to be "made up almost entirely of turning points and yet curiously devoid of drama or suspense" and called it a "live-action, reality-based version of a Disney cartoon: it's the heartwarming tale of a foundling taken in by strangers, who accept him even though he's different and treat him as one of their own."

According to Michael Rechtshaffen of The Hollywood Reporter, Bullock's character is an "irrepressible hoot in writer-director John Lee Hancock's otherwise thoroughly conventional take on Michael Lewis' fact-based book." In spite of her "feisty" and "energetic" performance, he felt that there was a lack of development concerning Michael's character: "Not until the end of the film do we ever get a chance to really see what's going on in Oher's head—how he feels about being the chosen one plucked from the poverty-stricken projects of Memphis and thrown into this protected, nonliberal-leaning environment of privilege." Peter Bradshaw of The Guardian described Bullock's appearance as "strangely humourless" and felt that "[t]here is something weirdly absent about this performance." Overall, he opined that the film provided "a Photoshopped [sic] image of reality that is bland, parochial, and stereotypically acted," and concluded: "There is a rich, complex story to be told about Michael Oher, and his mentor, Leigh Anne Tuohy. But this waxwork parade isn't it."

Race controversy
Jeffrey Montez de Oca of the University of Colorado-Colorado Springs writes that in The Blind Side's portrayal of adoption, "charity operates as a signifying act of whiteness that obscures the social relations of domination that not only make charity possible but also creates an urban underclass in need of charity." Melissa Anderson of the Dallas Observer argues that the "mute, docile" portrayal of Oher effectively endorses the Uncle Tom stereotype of African-American submission to white authority.

In her book, White Fragility, Robin DiAngelo criticized The Blind Side'''s perpetuation of "negative racial stereotypes", calling it "fundamentally and insidiously anti-black". She refers to a scene in which Oher returns to his stereotypically violent former neighborhood, only leaving when Tuohy rescues him from it. She also argues that the film portrays Oher as a simpleton who uses instinct over intellect, as a psychological test concludes that Oher has little "ability to learn" but much "protective instinct" (a scientifically nonsensical statement, according to DiAngelo).

Michael Oher has also voiced his displeasure with the movie and takes particular exception to its portrayal of his intelligence. In his book, I Beat The Odds: From Homelessness, to The Blind Side, and Beyond, Oher wrote, "I felt like it [the movie] portrayed me as dumb instead of as a kid who had never had consistent academic instruction and ended up thriving once he got it." The film's claim that he didn't understand football was another point of irritation for Oher. When talking about watching his adoptive family teach him he said, "No, that's not me at all! I've been studying—really studying—the game since I was a kid!" Despite his displeasure with his portrayal in the movie Oher has stated that he likes the film's message of perseverance and the general treatment of the Tuohy family and has been quoted as saying, "It's a great story. It seems like they helped me to get to this point. They're my family and without them I wouldn't be here," and "They taught me a lot of things, showed me a lot of different things. It shows that if you help somebody and give somebody a chance and don't judge people, look where they can get to."

Accolades

Best Picture nomination
The nomination of The Blind Side for Best Picture was considered a surprise, even to its producers. In an attempt to revitalize interest surrounding the awards, the Academy of Motion Picture Arts and Sciences had upped the number of Best Picture nominees from a mandatory number of five to ten in time for the 82nd Academy Awards, the year The Blind Side was nominated. However, in 2011, the Academy changed the policy, stating that the Best Picture category would feature from five to ten nominees depending on voting results, as opposed to a set number of nominees. The change was interpreted as a response to films like The Blind Side being nominated for Best Picture to fill up the set number of spots.Nicole Sperling and Amy Kaufman, Oscars change rule for best-picture race, Los Angeles Times, June 16, 2011, accessed February 4, 2014.

Soundtrack
The movie features 23 songs by artists including Les Paul, Young MC, Lucy Woodward, The Books, Canned Heat, Five for Fighting, and the film's co-star Tim McGraw. However, while the score soundtrack by Carter Burwell was released on CD, none of the featured songs were included.

Release
Home mediaThe Blind Side'' was released on DVD and Blu-ray on March 23, 2010. It was available exclusively for rental from Blockbuster for 28 days.

Redbox and Netflix customers had to wait 28 days before they were able to rent the movie. This stems from the settlement of a lawsuit brought by Redbox against Warner Home Video, who, in an attempt to boost DVD sales, refused to sell wholesale titles to Redbox. On August 19, 2009, Redbox sued Warner Home Video to continue purchasing DVD titles at wholesale prices. On February 16, 2010, Redbox settled the lawsuit and agreed to a 28-day window past the street date.

As of July 9, 2013, units sold for the DVD stand at more than 8.4 million copies and it has grossed a further $107,962,159 adding to its total gross.
The blu-ray was reissued as part of the Best of Warner Bros. 50 Film Collection (Warner Bros. 90th Anniversary Limited Edition) in 2013. There was also a release of this Limited Edition set issued on DVD.

See also
 White savior narrative in film

References

External links
 
 
 
 
 
 
 
 

2009 films
2009 biographical drama films
2000s English-language films
2000s sports drama films
3 Arts Entertainment films
Alcon Entertainment films
African-American biographical dramas
American football films
American sports drama films
Baltimore Ravens
Films about adoption
Films about Christianity
Films scored by Carter Burwell
Films based on non-fiction books
Films based on works by Michael Lewis
Films directed by John Lee Hancock
Films featuring a Best Actress Academy Award-winning performance
Films featuring a Best Drama Actress Golden Globe-winning performance
Films set in Memphis, Tennessee
Films shot in Georgia (U.S. state)
Films with screenplays by John Lee Hancock
Films about mother–son relationships
Ole Miss Rebels football
Sports films based on actual events
Summit Entertainment films
Warner Bros. films
2000s American films